Inal Grigoryevich Dzhioyev (born 5 November 1969) is a former Russian professional footballer.

Club career
He made his debut in the Soviet Top League in 1991 for FC Spartak Vladikavkaz.

Honours
 Russian Premier League champion: 1995.
 Russian Premier League runner-up: 1992, 1996.

European club competitions
All with FC Alania Vladikavkaz.

 UEFA Cup 1993–94: 2 games.
 UEFA Cup 1995–96: 2 games.
 UEFA Champions League 1996–97 qualification: 2 games.
 UEFA Cup 1996–97: 1 game.
 UEFA Cup 1997–98: 4 games.

References

1969 births
People from Tskhinvali
Living people
Soviet footballers
Russian footballers
FC Spartak Vladikavkaz players
Russian Premier League players
Association football midfielders
Association football defenders